RoadBlasters is a combat racing video game released in arcades by Atari Games in 1987. In RoadBlasters, the player must navigate an armed sports car through 50 different rally races, getting to the finish line before running out of fuel.

Gameplay

The objective is to complete all 50 rallies without running out of fuel. The player's car is equipped with a cannon that can be used to destroy enemy vehicles and roadside gun turrets for extra points. A scoring multiplier is set to 1 at the start of each rally. Each time the player successfully strikes a target, the multiplier increases by one, up to a maximum multiplier of 10. After missing a target, the multiplier drops by 1.

A helicopter occasionally flies overhead and drops a power-up item, which the player can pick up; these items have a limited number of uses. The player also encounters indestructible obstacles consisting of mines, boulders, floating "spiker" balls, and oil slicks, the last of which will cause the player to lose control for a moment if hit.

The player's car has two fuel tanks, a main tank and a smaller reserve. If the main tank runs empty at any time, the car begins to use its reserve. Red (dropped by enemies destroyed from a distance) and green (appearing at specific milestones) globes on the road add small amounts of fuel to the main tank when picked up. Reaching the halfway point of a rally resets the main tank to the level it had at the start of that stage, but does not affect the reserve. At the end of each rally, the main tank is refilled and fuel is added to the reserve based on the number of points scored in that stage.

Contact with any enemy, projectile, or obstacle other than an oil slick destroys the player's car, removes any power-up in effect, and resets the scoring multiplier to 1. The player loses a small amount of fuel while a replacement car is put on the road. There is no limit to the number of times that the player's car can be destroyed and replaced; the game only ends when both the main and reserve fuel tanks are exhausted.

The player may continue as many times as desired during the first 49 rallies, but is given only one chance to play the 50th and final one. Completing this rally awards a bonus of one million points and ends the game.

Promotions
A promotional giveaway was accessible on the original arcade version, where players could send in their name and "personalized secret code" after completing rally 50 and receive a free RoadBlasters T-shirt. The promotion ended August 31, 1987.

The game had a toy tie-in made by Matchbox. The toys were die-cast cars that could be customized with armor, lasers, machine guns, and rocket launchers and jet engines. There were two factions: Turbo Force and The Motor Lords. There also were play sets such as a mobile command base.

Reception

In a capsule review of the Atari Lynx version for STart, Clayton Walnum praised the game's massive length and combination of "standard racing with heaps of action." He added that "If you liked Roadblasters on another system, you won't be disappointed in the Lynx version."
CVG Magazine also reviewed the Atari Lynx version of the game, Julian Rignall went on to say "Roadblasters is a challenging game and is technically superb, with stunning graphics and great speech." He said it was fun but the levels were frustrating finally giving it a rating of 76 out of 100.

In a review of the Lynx version, Robert A. Jung concluded, "This is a mind-blowing awesome adaptation. I'd recommend it to most video-game players -- fans of driving games, fans of shooting games, fans of action games, and fans of the arcade original. It's a challenging, well-balanced arcade/action game, faithful to the original, worthy of the Lynx and offering lots of hours of fun.
This goes right up there with Blue Lightning as one of the best Lynx games around." He gave a score of 9 out of 10.

Legacy
The game appeared on the Sony PlayStation compilation Arcade's Greatest Hits: The Atari Collection 2 in 1998. It was also released for the PlayStation 2, Xbox, GameCube and PC as part of the Midway Arcade Treasures arcade game compilation.

A port can be played in Lego Dimensions via an Arcade Dock in the level "The Phantom Zone."

The game made an appearance in Disney's Wreck-It Ralph as the particular game the film's main antagonist, Turbo (also known as King Candy), tries to commandeer but accidentally ends up crashing the moment he drove his car into the players. As he was extremely jealous of being outshone by the new game, resulting in both this game and his own being unplugged and taken out of Litwak's Arcade (as shown in his backstory).

References

External links
 RoadBlasters at the Arcade History database
 
 

1987 video games
Amiga games
Amstrad CPC games
Arcade video games
Atari arcade games
Atari Lynx games
Commodore 64 games
Midway video games
Nintendo Entertainment System games
Racing video games
Sega Genesis games
U.S. Gold games
Vehicular combat games
Video games developed in the United States
ZX Spectrum games